A list of American films released in 1963.

Cleopatra - the highest-grossing film of 1963.



A-C

D-G

H-M

N-S

T-Z

See also
 1964 in the United States

External links

1963 films at the Internet Movie Database

1963
Films
Lists of 1963 films by country or language